The 2015–16 Big 12 men's basketball season was the 20th season of basketball for the Big 12 Conference. Team practices began in October 2015, followed by the start of the regular season on November 13. Conference play began on January 2, 2016, and concluded on March 5. Kansas won their 12th straight Big 12 regular season championship by finishing 33–5 overall and 15–3 in conference play, two games ahead of second-place West Virginia. The 2016 Big 12 men's basketball tournament took place from March 9–12, 2016 at the Sprint Center in Kansas City. Kansas won the tournament for the 10th time in school history.

Buddy Hield of Oklahoma was named Big 12 Player of the Year for the second consecutive year, and became just the third player in conference history to be named the National college player of the year.

Seven schools were awarded a berth to the NCAA tournament. Kansas, Oklahoma, and Iowa State each reached the Sweet 16, with Oklahoma advancing all the way to the Final four before losing to the eventual champions Villanova.

Preseason

(#) first place votes

Pre-Season All-Big 12 Team

Player of the Year: Buddy Hield, Oklahoma
Newcomer of the Year: Deonte Burton, Iowa State
Freshman of the Year: Cheick Diallo, Kansas

Rankings

Regular season

Conference matrix

Points scored

Baylor

Iowa State

Kansas

Kansas State

Oklahoma

Oklahoma State

TCU

Texas

Texas Tech

West Virginia

Honors and awards

All-Big 12 awards and teams

Phillips 66 Player of the Week

Postseason

Big 12 tournament

  March 9–12, 2016–Big 12 Conference Basketball Tournament, Sprint Center, Kansas City, MO.

Bracket

NCAA tournament

See also
 2015–16 NCAA Division I men's basketball season
 Big 12 Conference
 Big 12/SEC Challenge

References